This is a list of Italian football transfers for the 2009–10 season. Only moves from Serie A and Serie B are listed.

The summer transfer window will run from the end of the 2008–09 season, with a few transfers taking place prior to the season's complete end. The window will close on August 31. The mid-season transfer window will open on January 1, 2010, and run for the entire month, until January 31. Players without a club may join one, either during or in between transfer windows.

Summer transfer window (July)

1Player officially joined his new club on July 1, 2009.
2Player officially joined his new club after Copa Libertadores

Summer transfer window (August)

References
General

Specific

External links

Italy
Trans
2009